Kirby Cannon (born January 18, 1958) is an American college football coach and former player. He was the head football coach at Austin Peay State University (APSU), a position he held from March 2013 to November 2015. He served in the same capacity at Missouri University of Science and Technology (Missouri S&T) from 1999 to 2009, compiling a record of 35 wins and 86 losses. In January 2017, Cannon was tapped to be the defensive coordinator for the Northern Michigan Wildcats.

Head coaching record

References

External links
 Austin Peay profile

1958 births
Living people
American football quarterbacks
Austin Peay Governors football coaches
Central Michigan Chippewas football coaches
Iowa State Cyclones football coaches
Missouri S&T Miners football coaches
Missouri State Bears football players
North Central Cardinals football coaches
Northern Michigan Wildcats football coaches
Truman Bulldogs football coaches
Western Illinois Leathernecks football coaches